Alec Charles Edward Thurlow (24 February 1922 – 5 March 1956) was a footballer who played as a goalkeeper in the Football League for Manchester City.

References

Manchester City F.C. players
English Football League players
Association football goalkeepers
Huddersfield Town A.F.C. players
1922 births
1956 deaths
People from Diss, Norfolk
English footballers
20th-century deaths from tuberculosis
Tuberculosis deaths in England